Kristin Tate is an American libertarian columnist, political commentator and author based in Houston.

Career 
Tate grew up in New Hampshire and received her Bachelor of Arts degree at Emerson College in Boston.

She writes a weekly opinion column for The Hill. Her op-eds have additionally appeared in outlets such as National Review, Washington Examiner, and The Washington Times. Her first book, Government Gone Wild: How D.C. Politicians Are Taking You for a Rideand What You Can Do About It, was released by Hachette Book Group in April 2016. Her second book, How Do I Tax Thee?: A Field Guide to the Great American Rip-Off, was published by St. Martin's Press in 2018.

She appears frequently as a commentator on the Fox News Channel, Fox Business Network, MSNBC, and CNN. In 2016, Red Alert Politics named Tate to their list of the 30 most influential right-of-center leaders under the age of 30.

Tate is an analyst for the student libertarian group Young Americans for Liberty. Tate hosts a podcast presented by Young Americans for Liberty titled "You Built that". The podcast focuses on entrepreneurship, free enterprise, and free-market politics. Guests have included My Pillow, INC CEO Mike Lindell, Atlas Society CEO Jennifer Grossman, and Dallas salon owner Shelley Luther.

References

External links
 

Living people
Year of birth missing (living people)
American columnists
American libertarians
American women columnists
American women non-fiction writers
Emerson College alumni
Writers from New Hampshire
Writers from New York City
21st-century American women writers
21st-century American non-fiction writers